Tranzschelia discolor is a plant pathogen in the family Uropyxidaceae.

It can affect peaches (Prunus persica ) in Oman, with angular, yellow spots being seen on leaf upper surfaces with orange sori on the undersides.

References

External links 
 USDA ARS Fungal Database

Fungal plant pathogens and diseases
Teliomycotina